is a railway station in the city of  Gamagōri, Aichi Prefecture, Japan, operated by Central Japan Railway Company (JR Tōkai).

Lines
Mikawa-Miya Station is served by the Tōkaidō Main Line, and is located 308.3 kilometers from the starting point of the line at Tokyo Station.

Station layout
The station has two opposed side platforms connected to the station building by a footbridge. The station building has automated ticket machines, TOICA automated turnstiles and is unattended.

Platforms

Adjacent stations

|-
!colspan=5|Central Japan Railway Company

Station history
Mikawa Miya Station began operations on July 3, 1929 as a station on the Japanese Government Railway (JGR) Tōkaidō Main Line. the JGR became the JNR (Japan National Railways) after World War II. Regularly scheduled freight services were discontinued in 1972. With the dissolution and privatization of the JNR on April 1, 1987, the station came under the control of the Central Japan Railway Company. A new station building was completed in 1990.

Station numbering was introduced to the section of the Tōkaidō Line operated JR Central in March 2018; Mikawa-Miya Station was assigned station number CA46.

Passenger statistics
In fiscal 2017, the station was used by an average of 1940 passengers daily (boarding passengers only).

Surrounding area
Miya Fishing Port
Japan National Route 23

See also
 List of Railway Stations in Japan

References

Yoshikawa, Fumio. Tokaido-sen 130-nen no ayumi. Grand-Prix Publishing (2002) .

External links

Railway stations in Japan opened in 1929
Railway stations in Aichi Prefecture
Tōkaidō Main Line
Stations of Central Japan Railway Company
Gamagōri, Aichi